Roxie Albertha Roker (August 28, 1929 – December 2, 1995) was an American actress who portrayed Helen Willis on the CBS sitcom The Jeffersons (1975–1985), half of the first interracial couple to be shown on regular prime time television. Roker is the mother of rock musician Lenny Kravitz and paternal grandmother of actress Zoë Kravitz.

Early life
Roker was born in Miami, Florida. Her mother, Bessie Roker (née Mitchell), was from Georgia and worked as a domestic. Her father, Albert Roker, was a porter and a native of Andros, The Bahamas. She grew up in Brooklyn, New York.

Career
She began her professional career with the Negro Ensemble Company and became a successful stage actress. She won an Obie Award in 1974 and was nominated for a Tony Award for her portrayal of Mattie Williams in The River Niger. She was a reporter on WNEW-TV in New York in the 1970s and hosted a public affairs show for the station known as Inside Bed-Stuy, dealing with events in the Brooklyn neighborhood. Roker portrayed Helen Willis on The Jeffersons, breaking social barriers by becoming one half of the first Caucasian-African-American married couple (along with actor Franklin Cover) as regular cast member on prime-time TV. She appeared in guest starring roles on many other United States television shows from the 1970s through the 1990s, including "Stone in the River" starring Hal Miller for NBC, Punky Brewster, Hangin' with Mr. Cooper, A Different World, Murder, She Wrote, The Love Boat, $weepstake$, 227, Beat the Clock, Fantasy Island, and ABC Afterschool Specials. She had roles in the television miniseries Roots and in the movie Claudine. Roker was also a children’s advocate who was cited by the city of Los Angeles for her community work.

Personal life
Roker graduated from Howard University. She was married to television producer Sy Kravitz in 1962. Like her Jeffersons character Helen Willis, Roker had an interracial marriage to a white man. The couple had a son, singer-songwriter and actor Lenny Kravitz (born May 26, 1964), and divorced in 1985. Weather anchor Al Roker and Roxie Roker were second cousins once removed.

Death
Roker died in Los Angeles, California, on December 2, 1995 of breast cancer. She was 66.

Filmography

References

External links

1929 births
1995 deaths
Actresses from New York City
American people of Bahamian descent
American television journalists
American women television journalists
Deaths from cancer in California
Deaths from breast cancer
Howard University alumni
Musicians from Brooklyn
Actresses from Miami
Lenny Kravitz
American television actresses
African-American actresses
American film actresses
20th-century American actresses
20th-century American musicians
African-American women musicians